LSK Laćarak is a Serbian football club based in Laćarak, Sremska Mitrovica, Serbia.

Football clubs in Serbia
Football clubs in Vojvodina
1928 establishments in Serbia